Sebastopol station was an interurban train station in Sebastopol, California. It was served by the Petaluma and Santa Rosa Railroad and was adjacent to the railway's powerhouse. Official operations ceased in 1932 with the rest of P&SR passenger service. It was leased as retail space for a time before being converted to a museum. The station was added to the National Register of Historic Places in 1996 as Sebastopol Depot of the Petaluma and Santa Rosa Railway .

See also 
 National Register of Historic Places listings in Sonoma County, California

References

External links 

 magazine article from 2017 marking its 100th anniversary

Sebastopol, California
Railway stations in Sonoma County, California
National Register of Historic Places in Sonoma County, California
Railway stations on the National Register of Historic Places in California
Former railway stations in California
Railway stations closed in 1932